Charles Leroy Pruiett (April 10, 1883 – March 6, 1953) was a pitcher in Major League Baseball who played from 1907 through 1908 for the Boston Americans and Red Sox. He was born in Osgood, Indiana.

In a two-season career, Pruiett posted a 4–18 record with 54 strikeouts and a 2.83 ERA in 48 appearances, including 23 starts, seven complete games, three shutouts, five saves, and  innings of work.
 
Pruiett died in Ventura, California at age 69.

External links
Baseball Reference
Retrosheet

1883 births
1953 deaths
Boston Americans players
Boston Red Sox players
Major League Baseball pitchers
Baseball players from Indiana
Waco Tigers players
Dallas Giants players
St. Paul Saints (AA) players
New Orleans Pelicans (baseball) players
New Bedford Whalers (baseball) players
Oakland Oaks (baseball) players
People from Ripley County, Indiana